Saint Gregory, also Pope Gregory I or Gregory the Dialogist (c. 540 – 604), was Pope from 590 until his death.

Saint Gregory may also refer to:
 Gregory Thaumaturgus, (Gregory the Wonderworker), or  Gregory of Neocaesarea (died 270)
 Gregory of Spoleto (died 304)
 Gregory the Illuminator, or Gregory the Enlightener (died 331), Armenian saint, founder of the Armenian Apostolic Church
 Gregory of Nazianzus the Elder (died 373), bishop of Nazianzus, father of Gregory the Theologian and Caesarius of Nazianzus
 Gregory of Nazianzus, or Gregory the Theologian (died 390), one of the Three Holy Hierarchs
 Gregory of Nyssa (died after 394), Bishop of Nyssa
 Gregory of Tours (died 594), Gallo-Roman historian and Bishop of Tours
 Pope Gregory II (died 731), Pope from 715 to his death
 Pope Gregory III (died 741), Pope from 731 to his death
 Gregory of Utrecht, (died c. 770), German bishop
 Gregory of Dekapolis (died 816), Byzantine monk
 Gregory of Crete (Gregory of Akrita, died 820), Cretan saint venerated January 5
 Gregory of Narek (died ): Armenian monk and mystic
 Gregory of Moesia, (died 1012), Bulgarian bishop venerated January 8
 Pope Gregory VII (died 1085), Pope from 1073 to his death
 Gregory the Wonderworker of the Kiev Near Caves (died 1093), Kievan saint venerated January 8
 Gregory the Iconographer (12th century), Kievan iconographer and saint venerated August 8
 Gregory of Assos (died 1150), Bishop of Assos, venerated March 4
 Gregory of Novgorod (died 1193), Archbishop of Novgorod, venerated May 24
 Gregory of Nicomedia (died 1240), Byzantine ascetic and saint venerated April 2
 Gregory the Byzantine (died 1310), Byzantine monk and saint venerated April 6
 Gregory of Sinai (died 1347), Byzantine monk
 Gregory the Singer (died 1355), Byzantine monk and saint venerated October 1
 Gregory Palamas (died 1359), Archbishop of Thessalonica
 Gregory the Hermit (14th century), Kievan saint venerated January 8
 Gregory (14th century),  founder of Osiou Gregoriou monastery
 Gregory of Rostov (died 1416), Abbott of Kamenny Monastery and Archbishop of Rostov, Yiaroslavl and White Lake, venerated May 3
 Gregory of Pelsheme (died 1442), Abbot of Pelsheme and Wonderworker of Vologda, venerated September 30
 Patriarch Gregory V of Constantinople (1746–1821), Ecumenical Patriarch of Constantinople
 Geevarghese Gregorios of Parumala (1848-1902), Bishop of Parumala
 Gregory (Orologas) of Kydonies (1864–1922), Metropolitan of Cydoniae
 Grigol Peradze (1899–1942), Georgian Archimandrite

See also
Gregory (disambiguation)